Chaos Glacier is part of the Waddington Range in the southern British Columbia Coast Mountains in Canada, located at  .  It flows to the north from Mount Tiedemann for approximately four kilometers before joining the larger Scimitar Glacier. The name was officially adopted in 1978 from field sketches of the area by mountaineer Don Munday. The area's steep terrain makes this an excellent example of a continuous ice fall.

References 

Glaciers of the Pacific Ranges
Waddington Range